The BBC Drama Village is a television production facility run by the BBC. It is operated by their BBC Birmingham branch and based largely at the Selly Oak campus of the University of Birmingham in Birmingham, England.

The centre consists of five buildings. Archibald House and Melville House are Grade II listed arts and crafts-style former college buildings on the university campus. There are then three units on an industrial estate in nearby Stirchley. Facilities include studios and sets, wardrobe and technical departments and extensive post-production suites.

Programmes
Programmes made on the site have included:

 The Afternoon Play
 The Coroner
 Dalziel and Pascoe
 Doctors
 Father Brown
 WPC 56

References

External links

BBC offices, studios and buildings
Buildings and structures in Birmingham, West Midlands
Mass media in Birmingham, West Midlands
Selly Oak